Ringeltaube Vethamonikam Memorial Church, at Mylaudy in Kanyakumari district, Tamil Nadu, India, It's one of the largest and oldest churches in Asia. It's the cathedral of Kanyakumari Diocese, of the Church of South India (CSI).

In year 1996 Mylaudy Church was promoted as District Church.

On April 25, 2006 occasions of  "200th Ringeltaube & Vethamonikam Memorable Day" mylaudy Church was Promoted as Cathedral of Kanyakumari Diocese and South Travancore Diocese.

At present, This Single Seed (Mylaudy CSI Church) has spread like a Banyan tree and have been grown into three Diocese/congregations (Kanyakumari Diocese, South Kerala Diocese, Kollam-Kottarakkara Diocese).

Gallery

References

External links
 
 Ringletaube [sic. [An Account of William Tobias Ringeltaube.]                    
 The Oxford Encyclopaedia of South Asian Christianity

Churches in Kanyakumari district
Church of South India church buildings in India
1806 establishments in India